Venteira is a civil parish in the municipality of Amadora, Portugal. The population in 2011 was 18,539, in an area of 5.31 km2. In 2013, the northern part of the parish of Reboleira was merged into Venteira.

References

Parishes of Amadora